Lhuis is a commune in the Ain department in eastern France.

It is located in the Bugey region at the southern end of the Jura mountains.

Population

See also
Communes of the Ain department

References

External links

  Official site
  Tourist office

Communes of Ain
Ain communes articles needing translation from French Wikipedia
Bugey